Gudrun is a 1992 German drama film directed by Hans W. Geißendörfer. It was entered into the 42nd Berlin International Film Festival where it won an Honourable Mention.

Cast
 Kerstin Gmelch as Gudrun
 Barbara Thummet as Sophie
 Roman Mitterer as Fritz
 Veronika Freimanová as Lotte
 Bernd Tauber as Albert
 Michael Vogtmann as Zagel
 Walter Kraus as OGL

References

External links

1992 films
1992 drama films
German drama films
1990s German-language films
Films directed by Hans W. Geißendörfer
1990s German films